Protrepticus may refer to:

 Protrepticus (Aristotle), an exhortation to philosophy by Aristotle, which survives in fragmentary form
 Protrepticus, a work by the Roman writer Ennius
 Protrepticus, an exhortation to the study of the arts in general by Galen
 Protrepticus (Clement), an exhortation to Christian conversion by Clement of Alexandria
 Protrepticus, a work by the Neoplatonist Iamblichus
 Protrepticus, one of the Idyllia of Ausonius

See also
 Protrepsis and paraenesis, two closely related styles of exhortation
The Hortensius follows the style of a protrepticus.